Badlot is a village and Union Council of Jhelum District in the Punjab Province of Pakistan. It is part of Jhelum Tehsil, and is located at 32°55'0N 73°36'E and has an altitude of 231 metres (761 feet).

References

Populated places in Tehsil Jhelum
Union councils of Jhelum Tehsil